The Abu Dhabi Classico or the Al Classico is the rivalry between Al Ain and Al Wahda. The rivalry was first contested around the mid 1980s and has been the biggest  derby in the Emirate of Abu Dhabi. Al Ain is from the city of Al Ain in the Eastern region of the emirate while Al Wahda is from the city of Abu Dhabi in the Central region. Both clubs are among the most successful teams in the UAE with Al Ain having 34 honours while Al Wahda has 15 honours.

History
The rivalry between the two clubs stems from the fact that the two teams are the most successful clubs in Emirate of Abu Dhabi. Al Ain established themselves as a top club in Abu Dhabi by winning two Abu Dhabi championships in 1974 and 1975 and later a top club in the country when they won the League title in 1977. Al Wahda's success was limited during that time. The rivalry sparked when the two clubs started exchanging titles around  1997 to 2005, Al Wahda won three titles while Al Ain won five, three out of those eight seasons had both clubs finish at the top two. The 2004–05 season was one the most significant time as Al Wahda won the league title while Al Ain won the president's cup with a 3–1 score line at extra time. Even though Al Ain would win five more league titles while Al Wahda only won once, matches between the two continue to spark major controversies and the two clubs rarely sign players and managers that have represented the other club to this day. During a fixture between the two in March of 2022, fighting broke out between fans of both clubs after Al Ain won 1–0. Abu Dhabi police had to arrest several football fans during the incident.

Background
Al Ain being from the Eastern region while Al Wahda hails from the city of Abu Dhabi, the two clubs compete to the claim the title of Abu Dhabi's best club. Many argue that this rivalry is the most significant in the country as the two clubs had the longest duel of battling titles from the late 90s to early 2000s, however with teams like Shabab Al Ahli and Al Jazira gaining momentum in recent years, both clubs has shifted their focus away from traditionally competing against each other.

Statistics

Head to head

Honours

Shared players and managers

Players
The number of players that have played for both clubs are limited with the exception of a few local veterans. Only three foreign players have played for both clubs (Dzsudzsák, Lee and Valdivia) so far.

Al Ain, then Al Wahda

Al Wahda, then Al Ain

Managers
So far, Tite is the only coach to have represented both clubs, briefly managing Al Ain in 2007 and Al Wahda in 2010, his time at both clubs was cut short, getting sacked quickly at Al Ain due to disagreements with the club while at Al Wahda, he would sign for his former club Corinthians.

References

Football competitions in the United Arab Emirates
Football rivalries in the United Arab Emirates
Nicknamed sporting events